In human anatomy, the marginal artery of the colon, also known as the marginal artery of Drummond, the artery of Drummond, and simply as the marginal artery, is an artery that connects the inferior mesenteric artery with the superior mesenteric artery. It is sometimes absent, as an anatomical variant.

Structure
The marginal artery runs in the mesentery close to the large intestine as part of the vascular arcade that connects the superior mesenteric artery and the inferior mesenteric artery. It provides an effective anastomosis between these two arteries for the large intestine.

Variation 
The marginal artery is almost always present, and its absence should be considered a variant.

Clinical significance

Removal of the inferior mesenteric artery 
Along with branches of the internal iliac arteries, it is usually sufficiently large to supply the oxygenated blood to the large intestine. This means that the inferior mesenteric artery does not have to be re-implanted (re-attached) into the repaired abdominal aorta in abdominal aortic aneurysm repair.

Arc of Riolan 
The Arc of Riolan (Riolan's arcade, Arch of Riolan, Haller's anastomosis), also known as the meandering mesenteric artery, is another vascular arcade present in the colonic mesentery that connect the proximal middle colic artery with a branch of the left colic artery. This artery is found low in the mesentery, near the root. In the setting of chronic ischemic colitis, both the marginal artery and the meandering mesenteric artery may be enlarged significantly, and may provide significant blood flow to the ischemic colonic segment.

History 
The marginal artery is also known as the marginal artery of Drummond.

See also
Marginal branch of the right coronary artery, sometimes referred to as the marginal artery.
Marginal artery (disambiguation)

References

External links
Abdomen – University of Manitoba
  – "Branches of the superior mesenteric artery."
  – "Branches of the inferior mesenteric artery."

Arteries of the abdomen
Large intestine